James Wood Bush ( – April 24, 1906) was an American Union Navy sailor of British and Native Hawaiian descent. He was among a group of more than one hundred Native Hawaiian and Hawaii-born combatants in the American Civil War, at a time when the Kingdom of Hawaii was still an independent nation.

Enlisting in the Union Navy in 1864, Bush served as a sailor aboard  and the captured Confederate vessel , which maintained the blockade of the ports of the Confederacy. He was discharged from service in 1865 after an injury, which developed into a chronic condition in later life. The impoverished Bush was unable to return to Hawaii for more than a decade, during which time he traveled through New England and much of the Pacific. Back in Hawaii, he worked as a government tax collector and road supervisor for the island of Kauai, where he settled down. In later life, he converted to Mormonism and became an active member of the Hawaiian Mission. After the annexation of Hawaii to the United States, Bush was recognized for his military service, and in 1905 was granted a government pension for the injuries he received in the Navy. He died at his home on Kauai on April 24, 1906.

For a long period after the Civil War, the legacy and contributions of Bush and other documented Hawaiian participants were largely forgotten except in the private circles of descendants and historians. There has been a revival of interest, especially through the efforts of his great-grandniece Edna Bush Ellis and others in the Hawaiian community. In 2010, the "Hawaiʻi Sons of the Civil War" were commemorated with a bronze plaque erected along the memorial pathway at the National Memorial Cemetery of the Pacific in Honolulu.

Early life
James Wood Bush was born in Honolulu, on the island of Oahu. The date of his birth is uncertain; sources claim it to be October 1844, 1845, or 1847–1848.
He was the son of George Henry Bush (1807–1853), a native of Suffolk, England, who settled in Hawaii in 1825, and his Hawaiian wife.
Bush was thus of mixed Native Hawaiian and Caucasian descent, known as hapa haole in Hawaiian, although in the United States he was referred to as a "half-caste". His older brother was John Edward Bush, who became a newspaper publisher and politician, serving as royal governor of Kauaʻi and a cabinet minister under the reign of King Kalākaua. Little is known about Bush's life before 1864. Like his brother, he began his career as a sailor working on either merchant or whaling ships in the Pacific. Hawaiian sailors were highly regarded in the 18th- and 19th-century maritime industry.

American Civil War
After the outbreak of the American Civil War, the Kingdom of Hawaiʻi, under King Kamehameha IV, declared its neutrality on August 26, 1861. Some Native Hawaiians and Hawaiian-born Americans (mainly descendants of American missionaries) both abroad and in the islands volunteered to enlist in the military regiments of various states in the Union and the Confederacy. Individual Native Hawaiians had been serving in the United States Navy and Army since the War of 1812, and more served during the Civil War. Many Hawaiians sympathized with the Union because of Hawaiʻi's ties to New England through its missionaries and the whaling industries, and the ideological opposition of many to the institution of slavery.

Arriving in New England at the beginning of the war, Bush enlisted at Portsmouth, New Hampshire, for a three-year term as an "ordinary seaman" on September 27, 1864. He developed chronic laryngitis and spinal injuries due to his service in the Union Navy and was discharged in September 1865 at the Brooklyn Naval Hospital. When the war ended, the impoverished Bush had no way of returning to Hawaii. For the next decade, he lived in New Bedford, San Francisco, and Tahiti, finally returning to Hawaii in 1877. In 1905, after Hawaii became a US territory, Bush was granted a pension for his service in the Civil War, with back pensions dating from May 8, 1897.

Later life
After returning to Hawaii, Bush settled on the island of Kauai. In 1880, he was listed as the tax collector of Kawaihau, Kauai. In 1882, his older brother, in his capacity as Minister of the Interior, appointed Bush the Road Supervisor for the District of Hanalei to replace Christian Bertlemann, who had resigned. In 1887, Bush converted to Mormonism and was ordained an elder after two years, undertaking missionary work in the islands. He became the bishop of the Latter-day Saints ward in Kealia and hosted Mormon historian Andrew Jenson during his 1895 visit to Kauai. In around 1894, Bush married a young girl at Lahaina, traveling to Kona after their marriage.

Bush died of heart failure at Kealia, Kauai, on April 24, 1906. In the last years of his life, he was a janitor at the Kealia prison. He was survived by his wife and son. Lorenzo Taylor, writing for the Deseret News shortly after Bush's death, said, "[H]e has taken an active part in the missionary work, doing much good among his fellow men. He has also been very kind to the elders, and his doors were always open to them. He was greatly beloved and respected by all who knew him. His life was a noble example of faithful and untiring devotion to the Gospel." Bush is believed to be buried on Kauai, but the location of his grave is uncertain. According to Anita Manning, an Associate in Cultural Studies at Bishop Museum, "even the family can't find him".

Legacy
After the war, the military service of Hawaiians, including James Wood Bush and many others, was largely forgotten, disappearing from the collective memories of the American Civil War and the history of Hawaii. Hawaiian residents, historians, and descendants of Hawaiian combatants in the conflict have insisted on the need to remember the legacy of the Hawaiians who fought. Renewed interest in the stories of these individuals and this particular period of Hawaiian-American history has inspired efforts to preserve the memories of the Hawaiians who served in the war.

Stating that "our boys from Hawaii" should be remembered, Bush's great-grandniece Edna Bush Ellis was influential in reviving interest and in the effort to install a memorial recognizing their legacy. On August 26, 2010, on the anniversary of the signing of the Hawaiian Neutrality Proclamation, a bronze plaque was erected along the memorial pathway at the National Memorial Cemetery of the Pacific in Honolulu recognizing the "Hawaiʻi Sons of the Civil War", the more than one hundred Hawaiians who were documented as serving during the American Civil War for both the Union and the Confederacy. As of 2014, researchers have identified 119 documented Native Hawaiian and Hawaii-born combatants from historical records. The exact number still remains unclear because many Hawaiians enlisted and served under Anglicized names, and little is known about them due to the lack of detailed records.

In 2015, the sesquicentennial of the end of the American Civil War, the National Park Service released the publication Asians and Pacific Islanders and the Civil War about the service of the many combatants of Asian and Pacific Islander descent who fought during the war. The history of Hawaii's involvement and the biographies of Bush and others were written by historians Anita Manning, Justin Vance, and others.

See also
 Hawaii and the American Civil War

References

Bibliography
Books and journals

 
 
 
 
 
 
 
 
 
 

Newspapers and online sources

Further reading

External links

 
 

1840s births
1906 deaths
American people of Native Hawaiian descent
American military personnel of Native Hawaiian descent
Hawaiian Kingdom people
People of the Hawaiian Kingdom in the American Civil War
People of New Hampshire in the American Civil War
Union Navy sailors
Converts to Mormonism
Mormon missionaries in Hawaii
Hawaiian Kingdom Latter Day Saints
People from Kauai